Ernst Scherzer (born 5 October 1937) is a German alpine skier. He competed in the men's slalom at the 1964 Winter Olympics. He worked for the Stasi between 1977 and 1989.

References

1937 births
Living people
German male alpine skiers
Olympic alpine skiers of the United Team of Germany
Alpine skiers at the 1964 Winter Olympics
Sportspeople from Saxony
People of the Stasi
20th-century German people